Ambulance is a documentary series that follows the "life and death decisions on the frontline."  The BBC One format showcases their work "from control rooms to the crews on the street."

Episodes

Series overview

Series 1: London Ambulance Service (2016)

Series 2: West Midlands Ambulance Service (2017)

Series 3: West Midlands Ambulance Service (2018)

Series 4: North West Ambulance Service (2018–2019)

Series 5: North West Ambulance Service (2019–2020)
Series 5, again following the North West Ambulance Service, was split into two parts: the six episodes aired in 2019 were filmed in Manchester, and the six episodes shown in 2020 were filmed in Liverpool.

Series 6: London Ambulance Service (2020)

Series 7: North West Ambulance Service (2021)

Series 8: North West Ambulance Service (2021)

Series 9: North East Ambulance Service (2022)

Series 10: North East Ambulance Service (2022–23)
This series was split into two halves, with the first three episodes broadcast in October 2022. The series' last three episodes - which were originally planned to air in November 2022, were put on hold due to the FIFA World Cup 2022 tournament. It was then revealed during the 2022-23 festive season, that the remaining episodes from the series would resume broadcasting on Wednesday 4 January 2023.

Reception
Michael Hogan, writing for The Daily Telegraph gave the second series 4 stars, saying "All human life was here. We witnessed birth, death and resurrection in the space of just two shifts. It sure beats Casualty".

Awards and nominations
In 2018, Ambulance won its first major award, the BAFTA for the best factual series or strand.

International versions
Ambulance Australia screens on Network Ten in Australia.

The first series of Ambulance (אמבולנס), was aired on Reshet in Israel during 2018.

Notes

References

External links

2016 British television series debuts
2010s British documentary television series
2010s British medical television series
2020s British documentary television series
2020s British medical television series
BBC television documentaries
Television series by Endemol
English-language television shows